Wenceslao "Wenchesco" Emilio Retana y Gamboa (September 28, 1862 – January 21, 1924), also known  as W.E. Retana or Wenceslao E. Retana, was a 19th-century Spanish polymath. 

He was a civil servant, colonial administrator, writer, biographer, political commentator, publisher, bibliophile, bibliographer, Filipiniana collector, Spanish filipinologist, and Philippine scholar.  Retana was a "onetime adversary" of Philippine national hero José Rizal who later became an "admirer" who wrote the first biographical account of the life of Rizal entitled Vida y Escritos del Dr. José Rizal or "Life and Writings of Dr. José Rizal". Rosa M. Vallejo described Retana as the "foremost" non-Filipino filipinologist.

References

External links
Photograph of Wenceslao "Wenchesco" E. Retana at joserizal.info

Spanish civil servants
Spanish scholars
Bibliophiles
Spanish biographers
Spanish male writers
Male biographers
Spanish political writers
Spanish publishers (people)
19th-century Spanish writers
1862 births
1924 deaths
19th-century male writers